Hermosa niña is 1998 Colombian telenovela created by Jimena Romero from a screenplay by Bernardo Romero Pereiro. The series is produced by Fox Telecolombia (formerly known as Telecolombia) for Canal Uno. It stars Ana Lucía Domínguez as the titular character, it was also the second telenovela in which the singer Fanny Lu participated.

Plot 
The story revolves around Antonia Donoso (Ana Lucía Domínguez), a beautiful girl from Villamaría, a small town in Caldas, Colombia. His parents have taken care of their beauty as a precious gift. She is naive and very cheerful. His life could have been better if he had not dabbled on television. At fifteen he had fallen in love with a man 10 years older than her: Tomás Caballero. Television arrived in Manizales with all its technology and looking for a candidate to represent Ana del Campo (famous singer). Antonia, secretly from her parents, signs up to participate and wins.

Cast 
 Ana Lucía Domínguez as Antonia Donoso
 Tita Duarte as Antonia's mother
 Mariangelica Duque as Lady María
 Juan Pablo Franco as Valentín
 Hugo Gómez as Antonia's father
 Fanny Lu as Bianca
 José Luis Paniagua as Obando Durán
 Luis Fernando Salas as Tomás Caballero
 Vanessa Simon as Carolina Cruz
 Janeth Waltman as Carolina's friend

References

External links 
 

1998 telenovelas
Colombian telenovelas
1998 Colombian television series debuts
1998 Colombian television series endings
Spanish-language telenovelas
Spanish-language television shows
Television series about teenagers
Television series about television
Television series produced by Fox Telecolombia
Teen telenovelas